The 2022 Kashmir Premier League (also known as 2022 KPL or, for sponsorship reasons, Kingdom Valley KPL 2022) was the second season of the Kashmir Premier League, a cricket league which was established by the Pakistan Cricket Board (PCB) in 2021.

This season saw the expansion of the KPL from 6 teams to 7 teams. After the end of the first edition of the KPL, it was announced that there would be a seventh team added for the 2022 edition. An eighth franchise was also established for Gilgit-Baltistan but the team was removed from the tournament for unknown reasons. The KPL management held talks to hold the playoffs and final of the 2022 KPL in England but were unsuccessful. The tournament was originally scheduled to take place from 1 August to 14 August but it was rescheduled out of respect for Muharram. The draft was held on 21 July 2022. Rawalakot Hawks were the defending champions until they were knocked out in the group stage.

Franchises

Squads

Marketing
The 2022 KPL was promoted on social media using the hashtag #KheloAazadiSe, similar to its previous edition. Shahid Afridi was signed as brand ambassador for the 2022 KPL and the official singers were Sahir Ali Bagga and Aima Baig.

Anthem

The official anthem of the 2022 KPL, “Khelo Aazadi Se” was released on 29 July 2022 and it was sung by Sahir Ali Bagga and Aima Baig.

Broadcasters

Media personnels 
The KPL announced the media personnels on Twitter on 12 August 2022.

Commentary Panel 

  Aamir Sohail
  Daryll Cullinan
  HD Ackerman
  Marina Iqbal
  Nick Compton
  Waqar Younis

Presenters 
  Hijab Zahid
  Sikander Bakht

Venue
The whole tournament took place in Muzaffarabad, Azad Kashmir.

Umpires

  Aleem Dar
  Ahsan Raza
  Asif Yaqoob
  Rashid Riaz
  Faisal Afridi
  Shozab Raza
  Waleed Yaqub
  Imtiaz Iqbal
  Imran Javed
  Saqib Khan
  Ghaffar Kazmi
  Nasir Hussain
  Sajid Afridi
  Aaley Haider
  Mohammad Asif
  Zameer Haider
  Qaiser Waheed
  Aftab Gillani
  Ahmed Shahab
  Majid Hussain

League stage

Points table

League progression

Fixtures 
The schedule for the tournament was announced on 1 August 2022.

Playoffs

Preliminary

Qualifier

Eliminator 1

Eliminator 2

Final

Statistics

Most runs

Most wickets

Awards

Individual Awards

Dream Team

Controversies 
Four franchises of the KPL (Bagh Stallions, Mirpur Royals, Muzaffarabad Tigers and Rawalakot Hawks) wrote a letter to the PCB, requesting that the PCB withhold the NOC for the 2022 KPL. They cited the tournament management’s inefficiency to handle all of the matters properly. The main concerns were that an audit report was not provided for the first season and a league committee was not formed despite this being included in their agreement. The PCB also said that they would issue a NOC if certain conditions were met. The PCB later issued an NOC after the KPL provided all the requested documents. A league committee was also formed on 7 July 2022.

In August 2022, Nasir Yusuf, one of the co-owners of Kotli Lions, filed a petition in the Sindh High Court that Faisal Nadeem and Khalid Zia, the other co-owners of Kotli Lions, had sidelined him from the team. Yusuf’s lawyer said that Nadeem and Zia had overtook the team and had not contacted Yusuf. They said that Kotli Lions should be barred from participating in the tournament without Yusuf's permission. Faisal Nadeem, Khalid Zia, President of the KPL, Arif Malik, CEO of the KPL, Chaudhry Shahzad Akhtar and Vice-president of the KPL, Wasim Akram were all issued notices for 15 August from the court.

During the 2022 KPL, the KPL terminated Kotli Lions’ management after they weren’t able to pay outstanding payments. Kotli Lions’ head coach Saeed Azad left the team and was replaced by Mushtaq Ahmed. The KPL management temporarily took over Kotli Lions. The KPL also terminated the Overseas Warriors’ management after they were unable to pay their players. Zeeshan Altaf Lohya was later given ownership of Overseas Warriors.

In January 2023, the KPL management sent a legal notice to Kingdom Valley, sponsors of the 2022 KPL, for not paying the agreed amounts to the KPL. The KPL management claimed that Kingdom Valley still had to pay 137 million. The KPL also claimed that the KPL still had to pay players 90 million which they could only pay after receiving payments from sponsors. The owner of Kingdom Valley, Ghulam Hussain Shahid, claimed that the KPL had begged him to sponsor the tournament and had asked him to pay 40 million in advance and to pay the rest whenever he wanted. He also claimed that he had to pay all government taxes while the KPL paid none.

Criticism 
During the 2022 KPL, many of the league matches and all of the playoff matches were abandoned due to rain. Ghulam Hussain Shahid, the owner of Jammu Janbaz, criticised the KPL management and he said that the weather should have been considered prior to setting the dates of the tournament. Shahid said that the rain ruined the business end of the tournament and that the tournament should have taken place in Rawalpindi or Lahore as the stadiums there have proper infrastructure and the weather there would have been more suitable to play cricket. He said that he would work with the KPL management next year to improve the tournament.

See also
Kashmir Premier League
Bagh Stallions
GB Markhors
Jammu Janbaz
Kotli Lions
Mirpur Royals
Muzaffarabad Tigers
Overseas Warriors
Rawalakot Hawks

Notes

References

External links
 
League Records 2022

Domestic cricket competitions in 2022–23
Cricket in Pakistan
Muzaffarabad
Sport in Azad Kashmir
Kashmir Premier League (Pakistan)